The 2024 Tour de France is scheduled to be the 111th edition of the Tour de France. It will start in Florence, Italy on 29 June, and with the final stage, an individual time trial from Monaco to Nice on 21 July. 

Three stages will take place in Italy, with the Grand Départ taking place in the country for the first time. Owing to preparations for the Paris 2024 Olympic and Paralympic Games, the tour will finish in Nice with an individual time trial - the last time a time trial was the final stage in the Tour was in 1989. It will also be first time since 1905 that the tour hasn't finished in Paris.

References

External links

 

 
2024 in French sport
2024 in road cycling
2024 UCI World Tour
July 2024 sports events in France
2024
Tour de France
Tour de France